Laurus azorica, the Azores laurel or Macaronesian laurel, is a small, evergreen tree in the laurel family (Lauraceae), found only on the Azores island group in the North Atlantic.

Description
Each flower is fragrant, creamy white, about 1 cm diameter, and they are borne in pairs beside a leaf. The leaves are large, shiny dark green, broadly ovoid, 7–14 cm long and 4–8 cm broad, with an entire margin. The fruit is a black drupe about 1–2 cm long.

Distribution and habitat
Laurus azorica is native to the Azores, where it is found in all of the islands. It is a major component of the laurisilva and high altitude juniper forests, occasionally with Myrica faya and Picconia azorica populations in mid-altitude. It is also found in lava flows, margins of cultivated land, coastal scrubland, mountain scrubland and forested peat bogs.

Taxonomy
As the result of a recent taxonomic change, Laurus azorica is now restricted to the archipelago of the Azores, whereas former populations of this species from the western Canary islands including Gran Canaria and from the Madeira archipelago have been described as a new species, Laurus novocanariensis.

References 

Lauraceae
Endemic flora of the Azores
Taxonomy articles created by Polbot